Max Scheuer (9 September 1895 – post August 1941) was an Austrian international footballer who played the defender position. He played for the Austria national football team in the 1923 season. In the 1920s he played for and captained Hakoah Vienna. He was murdered in the Auschwitz concentration camp.

Biography
Scheuer was born in Austria, and was Jewish.

Scheuer was in the starting lineup and played as a defender for the Austria national football team against the Hungarian national football team in a FIFA match in the 1923 season.

In the 1920s Scheuer played for and captained Hakoah Vienna, an all-Jewish club. With the team he won the Austrian championship in the 1924–25 Austrian First League season, the first professional Austrian football title. In 1927 he and the team came to the United States to play the Bethlehem Steel Football Club, defending U.S. champion and 1926-27 champion of the American Soccer League. He fled Austria to France, and played briefly for Olympique Marseille.

He was captured by the Nazis while he was in France, on his way to neutral Switzerland. Aged 45, Scheuer was sent to Drancy internment camp in France, and then to Auschwitz concentration camp, where he was killed in the early 1940s.

Scheuer was one of at least seven Hakoah footballers killed in the Holocaust. Others were Josef Kolisch, Ali Schönfeld, Oskar Grasgrün, Ernst Horowitz, and the brothers Erwin Pollak and Oskar Pollak.

References 

Jewish Austrian sportspeople
Jewish footballers
SC Hakoah Wien footballers
Austria international footballers
Austrian expatriate sportspeople in France
Austrian footballers
Association football defenders
Expatriate footballers in France
Olympique de Marseille players
Drancy internment camp prisoners
Austrian people who died in Auschwitz concentration camp